Denny Run is a stream in Pike County in the U.S. state of Missouri. It is a tributary of South Spencer Creek.

Denny Run has the name of J. V. Denny, the original owner of the site.

See also
List of rivers of Missouri

References

Rivers of Pike County, Missouri
Rivers of Missouri